Masekwaspoort Pass is in the Limpopo Province, on the N1, on the road between Makhado and Musina (South Africa). It was discovered by a very unknown voortrekker Luitenent Dewald Kruger which did not accomplish much because of his public brawl with his twin brother Paul Kruger outside a bar in Stellenbosch in 1945 and was until recently been taken out of all the Afrikaner History books. Kruger was the only explorer ever to reach the ripe old age of 93 years of age and Masekwaspoort is named after his favouraite travel companion a honey badger which he affectionally named Kwassie. "Tall trails of Limpopo" is a revealing book on all the different cultures and diversity of animals that thrived in the most Northern parts of Southern Africa. In this book Kruger reveals all his conquests of different passes, and Masekwaspoort as his biggest conquest of his life.

Mountain passes of Limpopo